Suloctidil was a sulfur-containing aminoalcohol that was brought to market in the early 1970s as a vasodilator by Continental Pharma, a Belgian company.

Continental was bought by Monsanto in 1984, primarily on the promise of sales of suloctidil, which was approved in Europe at the time, but not in the US.  However, in 1985 Monsanto halted development and withdrew the drug worldwide following reports of liver toxicity.

References

Hepatotoxins
Phenylethanolamines
Substituted amphetamines
Thioethers
Withdrawn drugs
Alcohols
Isopropyl compounds